Historically, idiophones (percussion instruments without membranes or strings) have been widespread throughout the Caribbean music area, which encompasses the islands and coasts of the Caribbean Sea. Some areas of South America that are not geographically part of the Caribbean, but are culturally associated with its traditions, such as Guyana, Suriname, French Guiana and parts of Brazil are also taken into account.

Although some idiophones such as the mayohuacán and probably the maraca already existed among the indigenous Taíno population of the Greater Antilles before the Spanish colonization of the Americas, most idiophones were introduced in the Caribbean between the 17th and 19th centuries by enslaved Africans, which were ethnically diverse (Yoruba, Ewe, Fon, Igbo, Efik, Mandinka and Kongo, among others). Because of the different materials present in the islands, African slaves had to construct their instruments differently, and thus new instruments began to be developed.

References

Notes 

Idiophones
Idiophones
Caribbean idiophones
Central American and Caribbean percussion instruments